George Harold Morrison (December 24, 1948 – November 12, 2008) was a Canadian professional ice hockey player who played 361 games in the World Hockey Association and 115 games in the National Hockey League.  He played for the St. Louis Blues, Minnesota Fighting Saints and Calgary Cowboys. Morrison was born in Toronto, Ontario.

In the last game of the 73-74 WHA season, Morrison set a WHA record for the fastest hat trick in league history—scoring three goals within 43 seconds. He later scored his fourth goal of the game allowing him to reach the 40 goal milestone for the season.

He was also an NCAA Champion player at the University of Denver. He was inducted into the Denver University Athletic Hall of Fame in 2012. As a youth, Morrison played in the 1961 Quebec International Pee-Wee Hockey Tournament with the Scarboro Lions.

He died in Schenectady, New York in 2008 at the age of 59 from brain cancer.

Awards and honours

References

External links

1948 births
2008 deaths
Calgary Cowboys players
Canadian ice hockey left wingers
Denver Pioneers men's ice hockey players
Ice hockey people from Toronto
Minnesota Fighting Saints players
St. Louis Blues players
Undrafted National Hockey League players
NCAA men's ice hockey national champions
AHCA Division I men's ice hockey All-Americans
Deaths from brain cancer in the United States